King of the Dancehall is a 2016 American drama film directed by Nick Cannon. It was screened in the Special Presentations section at the 2016 Toronto International Film Festival. Rather than receiving a traditional theater or DVD release, Cannon decided to partner with and exclusively release it on YouTube Red on Russell Simmons' All Def Digital channel beginning in August 2017.

Cast
 Nick Cannon as Tarzan Brixton
 Kimberly Patterson as Maya Fenster
 Whoopi Goldberg as Loretta Brixton
 Busta Rhymes as Allestar "All Star Toasta"
 Kreesha Turner as Kaydeen
 Collie Buddz as Donovan "Dada" Davidson

References

External links
 
 

2016 films
2016 drama films
American drama films
2010s English-language films
2010s American films